Shatha Amjad Al-Hassoun (born 3 March 1981 in Casablanca, Morocco), better known as Shatha Hassoun, is a Moroccan-Iraqi singer who rose to fame as the winner of the 4th season of the pan-Arab television talent show Star Academy Arab World. She was the first Arab woman to win the competition. She is currently one of the most popular singers in both the Middle East and Maghreb region, and is referred to as the "daughter of Mesopotamia".

Early life
Hassoun was born to an Iraqi father who is a well-known reporter from Hillah, and a Moroccan mother who is a history teacher from Safi. Growing up, Hassoun divided her time between Morocco and France. She studied English Literature in Casablanca and continued her university studies in Tangier where she joined the program of Hotel and Tourism Management. Then she continued her studies in France where she gained her master's degree.

Hassoun has sung in many languages including Arabic, English, French, Spanish, Italian and German.

Her family, which includes her parents and her only brother, reside in Morocco while she currently lives in Dubai.

Career

Aftermath of Star Academy 
In 2007 Hassoun won Star Academy 4, making her the first female winner. Her performance of Lebanese singer Fairouz's song "Baghdad" earned her 54.8% of the vote which enabled her to reach the finals. Along with the four finalists, Hassoun won the competition by receiving 40 percent of the votes.

Soon after winning the competition, Hassoun released her first single entitled "Rooh", which was written and composed by Lebanese songwriter Nikola Saada Nikhla. It was the first song to ever debut at number one on Rotana's PEPSI Top 20 charts, as it stayed at number for two weeks then peaking again at number one. The second song, "Asmallah Asmallah" or "Ebin Bladi", was written and composed by the Iraqi poet, Karim Al Iraqi as a gift to the Iraqi people and The Iraqi national football team which won the Asian Cup 2007. "Oushaq"  was written and composed by the Lebanese singer Marwan Khoury. Hassoun also revived several traditional Iraqi songs; "Allela 7elowa" and "Aleik As'al" as a duo with Ilham al-Madfai. She also released an Iraqi song, "Mza'elni", that was written by Amar Almarhon and composed by Mohand Mehsen, and "Lo alf mara" which was the first song composed by Melhem Barakat for a non-Lebanese artist. Hassoun is also working with the Iraqi poet Karim Al Iraqi to produce new Iraqi songs,who has worked with the likes of Kazem al Saher. Hassoun has worked with Salah Al-Sharnoby, Ramy Ayach, Assi El Helani, Abadi Aljawher and George Wassouf for a common art work .

Acting 
Away from the singing, Hassoun has participated in an Iraqi-Syrian-Egyptian television series called Rasael Men Ragol Mayet (letters from a dead man), alongside Syrian actor Ghassan Masoud and many Iraqi actors. The series talks about the problems of Iraqi society between 1979 and 2005. Directed by Hassan Hosny, the series was filmed in Syria and aired exclusive on Al-Baghdadia TV in the month of Ramadan 2008.

2009–present 
In late July 2009, Shatha achieved her life dream and the dream of fans when she went to her country's capital Baghdad and sang there in two big charity concerts for the children of Iraq, the first one in Al-elowea club and second one in Hunting Club, then she hold a press conference in Baghdad where she talked about her joyful to be a first Iraqi and Arab singer who visited Baghdad after war 2003 despite the unstable security in Baghdad and Predict murder in 2009 from one of Astrologer.

Hassoun is working on her album that is going to include songs in the Iraqi, Lebanese, Gulf, Moroccan, and Egyptian dialects. Her main goal is—as she said in an interview—to represent her beloved country Iraq in the best way.

Hassoun filmed her music video for the song "O'd 3rgoub" with the late Lebanese director Yehia Saade in Beirut and has toured across North America, Syria, Lebanon, Jordan, Kuwait, Sweden and Egypt.

In 2010 she held a concert in Dubai alongside Fares Karam.

Commercials 

Shatha Hassoun has also appeared in two television advertisements for the Iraqi mobile company, Zain.

1-During StarAc Arab 4,Shatha had won "the top 1 of the week" as the best student in week 13 in all respects (Evaluation,Study-Hard,Involve in classes,Deal with students ...etc.),So the academic administration surprise her with a unique gift which was filming a TV advertisement for new SMS service in Zain(MTC Atheer-Previously) and as a national support by sing a traditional Iraqi song in modern style alongside the famous Iraqi singer Ilham al-Madfai who love shatha's voice

2-After Shatha Hassoun winning in Star Academy and when the Iraqi national football team won the Asian Cup 2007, Zain deal with Shatha and 3 players from the team in a second Mobile advertisement,The work talk about optimism for New Iraq after its wars and tragedies in the past through several shots of Reconstruction of Iraq and they performed the anthem.

Awards
2007 Murex D'or Award – Best Uprising Artist (held in Casino du Liban)
2008 DG Festival Award – Best Rising Female Singer
2008 Art Festival Award- Best Rising Female Singer
2009 Murex D'or Award

Discography

Singles

First Album ( Wajh Thani )

Filmography

Television 
 Rasael Men Ragol Mayet (Letters from a dead man) – 2008
so you think you can dance

References

External links 

1981 births
Living people
People from Casablanca
21st-century Moroccan women singers
Moroccan actresses
21st-century Iraqi women singers
Iraqi film actresses
Iraqi television actresses
Star Academy winners
Contestants from Arabic singing competitions
Iraqi people of Moroccan descent